The Ancre is a river of Picardy, France. Rising at Miraumont, a hamlet near the town of Albert, it flows into the Somme at Corbie. For most of its length it flows through the department of Somme. For a short stretch near Puisieux, it forms the border with Pas-de-Calais.

See also
 Battle of the Ancre Heights (October 1916)
 Battle of the Ancre (November 1916)

References

Rivers of France
Rivers of Somme (department)
Rivers of the Pas-de-Calais
Rivers of Hauts-de-France